Shake is an album by The Thing, the trio of saxophonist Mats Gustafsson, bassist Ingebrigt Håker Flaten and drummer Paal Nilssen-Love. The album was recorded in June 2015 and released that year by the band's eponymous label.

Recording and music
The album was recorded on 1 and 2 June 2015. For "Aim", Anna Högberg (alto sax) and Goran Kajfes (cornet) were added to the trio: "Based on a simple six-note vamp, the hypnotic intro gives way to a complete communion of collective improvisation before stripping itself back to a skeletal whisper of its theme." "Til Jord Skal Du Bli", "Sigill" and "Fra Jord Er Du Kommet" "are unusually reflective for The Thing".

Releases
Shake was released on 30 October 2015 by The Thing's eponymous label. It was released on CD, vinyl and cassette.

Reception
Thom Jurek's review for AllMusic concluded that "This is free jazz-funk for those who insist on an identifiable center in avant music. The Thing are masters at this and, as a result, can always push further into sound and song and a nearly danceable collective conversation."

Track listing
"Viking Disco/Perfection" (Paal Nilssen-Love/Ornette Coleman) – 6:29
"Til Jord Skal Du Bli" (Ingebrigt Håker Flaten) – 8:28
"The Nail Will Burn " (Loop) – 2:43
"Sigill" (Colin Bergh) – 5:39
"Aim" (Mats Gustafsson) – 13:15
"Bota Fogo" – 7:28
"Fra Jord Er Du Kommet" (Flaten) – 7:23

Personnel
Mats Gustafsson – baritone sax, tenor sax
Ingebrigt Håker Flaten – double bass, electric bass
Paal Nilssen-Love – drums, percussion
Anna Högberg – alto sax (track 5)
Goran Kajfes – cornet (track 5)

References

2015 albums
The Thing (jazz band) albums
Free jazz albums